Yuxarı Apu (also, Verkhneye Apu and Yukhary Apu) is a village in the Lankaran Rayon of Azerbaijan.  The village forms part of the municipality of Daştatük.

The village is home to several endangered native plants.

References 

Populated places in Lankaran District